Black Mountain is a prominent 5,891 foot (1,796 meter) mountain summit located in the Alsek Ranges of the Saint Elias Mountains, in southeast Alaska. The months May through June offer the most favorable weather for viewing or climbing Black Mountain. Weather permitting, Black Mountain can be seen from Muir Inlet of Glacier Bay, which is a popular destination for cruise ships.

Climate

Based on the Köppen climate classification, Black Mountain has a subarctic climate with cold, snowy winters, and cool summers. Weather systems coming off the Gulf of Alaska are forced upwards by the Saint Elias Mountains (orographic lift), causing heavy precipitation in the form of rainfall and snowfall. Temperatures can drop below −20 °C with wind chill factors below −30 °C. This climate supports the Riggs Glacier below the west slopes, and McBride Glacier to the east.

See also

List of mountain peaks of Alaska
Geography of Alaska

References

External links
 Weather forecast: Black Mountain

Mountains of Glacier Bay National Park and Preserve
Saint Elias Mountains
Landforms of Hoonah–Angoon Census Area, Alaska
Mountains of Alaska
North American 1000 m summits